The Bureau of Reclamation Security Response Force (USBR SRF), is the federal security guard force of the United States Bureau of Reclamation (USBR) (which oversees water resource management), part of the United States Department of the Interior (DOI).

The Security Response Force replaced the former Hoover Dam Police, in 2017.

They are an armed quick-reaction force for USBR property (water dams).

Structure and Duties
The Security Response Force (SRF) is the security federal guard force of the Bureau of Reclamation. Personnel are known as "Security Response Force Officer"

of the following locations:

Hoover Dam
Grand Coulee Dam
Glen Canyon Dam

The SRF protects the delivery of water and power to the public.

SRF protect employees, visitors and public on Reclamation lands and Bureau of Reclamation property.

History
The Hoover Dam used to be policed by the Hoover Dam Police, but they were disbanded in 2017.
The Hoover Dam is now served by the National Park Service Law Enforcement Rangers and the SRF.

The NPS Rangers are more law-enforcement/rescue focussed and SRF is more security-force focussed.

Uniform
SRF officers wear a tactical style uniform, with polo shirts, khaki trousers, equipment vests, baseball caps and boots.

Equipment
SRF officers are armed personnel.
They have marked vehicles with lightbars and spotlights.

See also
Hoover Dam Police
Federal Law Enforcement

References

Federal law enforcement agencies of the United States
United States Bureau of Reclamation
Law enforcement agencies of Nevada
2017 establishments in Nevada